Galerella is a genus of fungi in the Bolbitiaceae family. The widespread genus contains six species.

References

External links

Bolbitiaceae